Calopadia editae is a species of lichen in the family Pilocarpaceae. Described as new to science in 2011, the species is named in honor of Hungarian lichenologist Edit Farkas.

References

Pilocarpaceae
Lichen species
Lichens described in 2011
Lichens of Africa
Lichens of Central America
Lichens of South America
Taxa named by Robert Lücking